In Greek mythology, Acadine was a magical fountain in Sicily, said to be described by the Greek historian Diodorus Siculus, though no such mention can be located. When writings were thrown into the fountain, they floated to the top if genuine, but otherwise sank to the bottom where they were devoured by Hades.

Note

Fountains
Locations in Greek mythology